The 2015 ESF Women's Championship was an international European softball competition that was held in Rosmalen, Netherlands from July 19 to July 25, 2015.

Results

Group A

Group B

Group C

Group D

Medal Round

Final standings

References

Womens Softball European Championship
Women's Softball European Championship
Womens Softball European Championship
Softball competitions in the Netherlands